von Stein is a surname. Notable people with the surname include:

Albert von Stein (fl. 1513–22), Swiss mercenary
Charlotte von Stein (1742–1827), German noble
Franz Joseph von Stein (1832–1909), German Roman Catholic archbishop
Hermann von Stein (1854–1927), Prussian general and minister of war
Lenore Von Stein, composer and opera singer
Lieth Von Stein (1946–1988), American murder victim
Lorenz von Stein (1815–1890), German economist and sociologist
Margherita von Stein (1921-2003), Italian gallerist and art collector
Pedro Koechlin von Stein, Peruvian politician
MJ Hegar, nee von Stein, American politician

See also
House of Graben von Stein